The Wallooskee River (also known as the Walluski River) is a tributary of the Youngs River, about  long, in northwest Oregon in the United States. It drains a small area of the foothills of the Coast Range near the mouth of the Columbia River. The Youngs River is a tributary of the Columbia River.

It flows generally west in a winding course.

Walluski
The name of the river was formerly spelled "Walluski" but the Board on Geographic Names changed it to "Wallooskee" in 1975. Although there is not a formal settlement by the name of Walluski, Oregon, the Olney-Walluski area is considered a community by local residents and the Walluski area was a census precinct as recently as 1950. As of 1892, there was a Walluski School. The school was located near Oregon State University's John Jacob Astor Agricultural Experiment Station, that was later used as the Clatsop Community College farm and today is the site of the Clatsop County Fairgrounds.

There is also a Walluski soil series named for the area.

See also
Klaskanine River
List of rivers of Oregon

References

External links

Rivers of Oregon
Rivers of Clatsop County, Oregon
Oregon placenames of Native American origin